James McKenzie Morrison (born July 18, 1990) is an American professional boxer. He is the son of former heavyweight world champion of boxing, Tommy Morrison.

Professional career
Morrison has a record of 20-1-2 (18KO).  He has a victory over Hasim Rahman Jr. by TKO on April 29 in Las Vegas to contest the USA-USNBC heavyweight belt.  He lost his next fight to Robert Simms by unanimous decision on October 22, 2022.

References

1990 births
Living people
American male boxers
Heavyweight boxers
Boxers from Oklahoma